Moin Akhter (also: "معین اختر" Moin Akhtar), (24 December 1950 – 22 April 2011) was a  Pakistani television, film and stage artist, humorist, comedian, impersonator, host, writer, singer, director and producer who rose to fame in the era of Radio Pakistan along with his co-actors Anwar Maqsood and Bushra Ansari. He became an icon through his screen persona "Rozi" and is considered to be a one-of-a-kind parodist and the king of Urdu comedy. His career spanned more than 45 years, from childhood in the Radio Pakistan era of modern film making until a year before his death in 2011.

Early life
Akhter was born in Karachi, Pakistan. His father Muhammad Ibrahim Mehboob, who died a few months after Akhtar died, at the age of 92, was born in Muradabad, in the modern-day state of Uttar Pradesh in India, and settled in Karachi as a result of the Partition, where he "passed his life in his own printing press and as a contractor in the garments business." Akhter was fluent in several languages, including English, Bengali, Sindhi, Punjabi, Memoni, Pashto, Gujarati and Urdu.

Career
Akhter started his acting career as child actor at the age of 13. He played the character of Shylock in Shakespeare’s The Merchant of Venice in theatre.

Akhter's sense of humour was highly dynamic and versatile. He made his television debut on 6 September 1966, in a variety show on Pakistan Television (PTV) to celebrate the first Defence Day of Pakistan. He started as a comedian in 1966 by impersonating the Hollywood actor Anthony Quinn and mimicked one of the former USA's president John F Kennedy’s speeches. He has performed several roles in television stage shows, later teamed with Anwar Maqsood and Bushra Ansari.

Rozi
Akhter rose to the national spotlight and gathered critical acclaim for his performance in the drama Rozi, in which he played the role of a female TV artist. Rozi was an Urdu adaptation of the Hollywood movie Tootsie starring Dustin Hoffman. He called it one of his favourite on-screen characters that he had played. Rozi was written by Imran Saleem and Directed by Saira Kazmi.

Talk shows
In the talk-show Loose Talk, which began in 2005 on ARY Digital, he appeared as a different character in each episode with a total of over 400 episodes interviewed by the TV host Anwar Maqsood, who was also the writer of the programme. Akhter also briefly hosted the game show Kya Aap Banaingay Crorepati?, the Pakistani version of Who Wants to be a Millionaire?. He hosted shows involving major personalities and performed on stage alongside Indian legends including Dilip Kumar, Lata Mangeshkar and Madhuri Dixit.

Television drama serials
Akhter acted in several films, sitcoms and dramas, and hosted many TV talk shows, including:

Host
He hosted shows with invited dignitaries including King Husain of Jordan, Prime Minister of Gambia Dawoodi Al-Joza, Presidents Zia-ul-Haq, Ghulam Ishaq Khan, General Yahya Khan and Pervez Musharraf (Akhter mimicked the president in his presence), Prime Minister Zulfiqar Ali Bhutto and the legendary Indian film actor Dilip Kumar.

Songs and albums
Album – Tera Dil Bhi Yun Hi Tadpe
 "Chhorr Ke Jaane Wale"
 "Choat Jigar Pe Khai Hai"
 "Ro-Ro Ke De Raha Hai"
 "Tera Dil Bhi Yun Hi Tadpe"
 "Dard Hi Sirf Dil Ko Mila"
 "Dil Ro Raha Hai"
 "Hoten Hai Bewafa"

Death and legacy
Akhter died on 22 April 2011 at about 4:30 pm in Karachi after suffering a heart attack. He was survived by his wife, three daughters and two sons. Funeral prayers for Akhter were offered in Tauheed Masjid near his residence. Thousands of people attended the funeral prayer which was led by Junaid Jamshed. Many Bollywood actors paid tribute to Akhter including Johnny Lever, Javed Akhtar, Javed Jaffrey  and Shatrughan Sinha.

The world-famous wax museum Madame Tussauds has expressed a wish to include a waxwork of Moin Akhter in its London museum. If the statue is eventually made, it will be the first of its kind for any Pakistani entertainer.

Awards and nominations 
 Honorary Citizenship of Dallas in 1996 for his achievements.
 Special Award for Comedy in The 1st Indus Drama Awards 2005
 Pride of Performance, awarded in 1996 by the Government of Pakistan
 In 2000 he won Best Actor Award at PTV Awards
 Sitara-i-Imtiaz, awarded in 2011

See also 
 List of Pakistani male actors

References

External links
 

1950 births
2011 deaths
Muhajir people
Pakistani male comedians
Pakistani male film actors
PTV Award winners
Pakistani playback singers
20th-century Pakistani male singers
Pakistani male stage actors
Pakistani male television actors
Pakistani game show hosts
Pakistani impressionists (entertainers)
Male actors from Karachi
Muslim male comedians
Recipients of Sitara-i-Imtiaz
Male actors in Urdu cinema
Hum Award winners
Recipients of the Pride of Performance